Jeff Kyrzakos (born February 6, 1985) is a Canadian former professional ice hockey player. He last played with the Arizona Sundogs of the Central Hockey League (CHL) He is currently the assistant coach and assistant GM of the OHL's Mississauga Steelheads.

Kyrzakos was a member of the 2010–11 Ray Miron President's Cup winning Bossier-Shreveport Mudbugs CHL championship team, and was selected as the 2011 CHL playoff's most valuable player.

Awards and honours

References

External links

1985 births
Living people
Arizona Sundogs players
Bossier-Shreveport Mudbugs players
Canadian ice hockey centres
Charlotte Checkers (1993–2010) players
Ice hockey people from Ontario
Mississippi Sea Wolves players
Owen Sound Attack players
Phoenix RoadRunners players
Rapid City Rush players
Sportspeople from Mississauga
Stockton Thunder players